General elections were held in Sierra Leone on 14 May 2002 to elect a president and parliament. Incumbent President Ahmed Tejan Kabbah of the Sierra Leone People's Party (SLPP) was re-elected with more than 70% of the votes in the first round, meaning that a second round of voting was not required. In the parliamentary elections, the SLPP received almost 70% of the vote, winning 83 of the 112 seats. The All People's Congress became the main opposition party, replacing the United National People's Party.

The United Nations Mission in Sierra Leone was authorised, under Security Council Resolution 1389 (2002), to assist in the electoral process.

Campaign
A total of 1,351 candidates contested the parliamentary elections, representing ten parties.

Results

President

Parliament

References

Sierr Leone
Elections in Sierra Leone
Election
Presidential elections in Sierra Leone
Election and referendum articles with incomplete results
May 2002 events in Africa